Streptomyces luteireticuli is a bacterium species from the genus of Streptomyces. Streptomyces luteireticuli produces mycometoxin A, mycometoxin B, aureothricin and thiolutin.

See also 
 List of Streptomyces species

References

Further reading

External links
Type strain of Streptomyces luteireticuli at BacDive -  the Bacterial Diversity Metadatabase

luteireticuli
Bacteria described in 2003